Captain Jenks' Dilemma is a 1912 silent comedy short film produced by the Vitagraph Company of America and distributed through the General Film Company. It starred John Bunny and Julia Swayne Gordon. Also in the cast were Dolores and Helene Costello.

The film survives in the Library of Congress.

Cast
John Bunny - Captain Jenks
Julia Swayne Gordon - Mrs. Brown, A Widow
Charles Eldridge - Sir Brian Squills
Kenneth Casey - One of Widow Brown's Children
Dolores Costello - One of Widow Brown's Children
Helene Costello - One of Widow Brown's Children

References

External links
Captain Jenks' Dilemma at IMDb.com

1912 films
American silent short films
Vitagraph Studios short films
1912 short films
1912 comedy films
American comedy short films
American black-and-white films
Silent American comedy films
1910s American films